Richa Chadha (born 18 December 1986) is an Indian actress, producer and political activist who works in Hindi cinema. After debuting in a small role in the comedy film Oye Lucky! Lucky Oye! (2008), Chadha's breakthrough came in 2012 with a supporting role in the noir gangster saga Gangs of Wasseypur, where her role as the bellicose and foul-tongued wife of a gangster earned her a Filmfare award.

In 2015, Chadha made her debut in a leading role with the drama Masaan (2015).

Early life and education 
Chadha was born on 18 December 1986 in Amritsar, Punjab, India into a Hindu family to a Punjabi father and a Bihari mother. She was educated at Sardar Patel Vidyalaya and then at the St. Stephen's College in New Delhi. Her father owns a management firm and her mother, Kusum Lata Chadha, is a professor of political science at PGDAV College of Delhi University, who has authored two books and also works with Gandhi Smriti.

Career 
Chadha began her career as a model and then she moved to theater. She has performed plays touring in India

Initial struggles (2008–2011) 

Chadha made her acting debut in a supporting role as Dolly in Dibakar Banerjee-directed 2008 film Oye Lucky! Lucky Oye!. She appeared in the 2010 comedy film Benny and Babloo as Fedora. In the meanwhile, a Kannada movie in which she had acted, titled Nirdoshi was released in 2010 after a delay of almost three years.

Breakthrough and recognition (2012–2015) 
In 2012, she acted in Anurag Kashyap's crime drama Gangs of Wasseypur – Part 1. She stated in an interview that this role as 'Nagma Khatoon' helped her get 11 film roles. The film premiered at the 65th Cannes Film Festival. She reprised her role as Nagma Khatoon in the sequel Gangs of Wasseypur – Part 2. The film premiered in the Cannes Directors' Fortnight at the Cannes Film Festival with its prequel. Chadha received a Filmfare Award nomination in the Best Supporting Actress category and won the Filmfare Critics Award for Best Actress.

Chadha's first release of 2013 came in the Mrighdeep Singh Lamba-directed coming of age comedy  film Fukrey, in which she portrayed a tough-talking female don Bholi Punjaban. She then appeared in one of the segments in the Anurag Kashyap-produced anthology film Shorts titled "Epilogue". Chadha and Shirvastav play a dysfunctional couple who seem extremely unhappy with each other.

Chadha next appeared in a supporting role as Rasila in Sanjay Leela Bhansali-directed drama film Goliyon Ki Raasleela Ram-Leela, an adaptation of the Shakespearean tragedy of Romeo and Juliet. She received a nomination in IIFA Best Supporting Actress category for the role. Chadha next appeared in Navneet Behal-directed 2014 film Tamanchey in the role of Babu, a criminal. It was screened out of competition at the 71st Venice International Film Festival. Her next movie was a biopic of Charles Sobhraj, Main Aur Charles.

Critical and commercial success (2016–present) 
In January 2016, Chadha appeared as a journalist in the social-drama Chalk n Duster. She later appeared in Sarbjit, a biographical-drama film based upon the life of Sarabjit Singh. She portrayed the role of Sukhpreet, and share screen alongside Aishwarya Rai and Randeep Hooda.

In 2017, Richa acted in an Indian web-series Inside Edge, playing the lead character of a struggling actress. The series was positively received by both critics and audience. In the same year, Jia Aur Jia was released. The film received unfavorable reviews from critics and did not perform well at box office too. After that, she reprised her role as Bholi Punjaban in Fukrey Returns, a sequel to 2013 film Fukrey.

Richa Chadha worked in Sudhir Mishra's version of the Devdas saga, entitled Aur Devdas as Paro. Her much delayed film with Pooja Bhatt, Cabaret, released on 9 January 2019. Chadha also worked for David Womark's Indo-American production Love Sonia. The film had its world premiere at the London Indian Film Festival on 21 June 2018. The film was released in India on 14 September 2018.[6] Her two films, Section 375 a courtroom drama produced by Kumar Mangat Pathak, Abhishek Pathak and directed by Ajay Bahl, co-starring Akshaye Khanna was released on 13 September 2019. And her second film Panga directed by Ashwiny Iyer Tiwari with Kangana Ranaut as main lead, was released on 24 January 2020. And her Upcoming web-film Lahore Confidential ZEE5 Spying thriller film includes a cross-border love story for RAW Agent Ananya, played by Richa Chadha released on 11 December 2020. Her latest film Shakeela released in theatres on 25 December 2020.

Her upcoming film includes Anubhav Sinha’s Abhi Toh Party Shuru Hui Hai.

Venture into production (2021–present) 
In 2021, she started her own film production company named Pushing Buttons Studios with Ali Fazal.

Personal life 

In 2006, Chadha directed and wrote 20-minute documentary film called "Rooted in Hope." In 2008, she participated in the "Gladrags Megamodel Contest."
In May 2016, Chadha revealed in an interview to NDTV that she had suffered from bulimia (an eating disorder) for several years, and that she had recovered after seeking professional help from a clinical psychiatrist. Attributing her eating disorder to patriarchy, misogyny and the prevalence of the 'male gaze' in the field of entertainment, she exhorted other women to go public with their own (patriarchy-induced) eating and mental disorders and called for the destruction of 'ways of thinking' which oppressed women.

She has been in a relationship with Ali Fazal. She currently resides in Mumbai.

Richa Chadha considers  B. R. Ambedkar as her icon.

On 23 September 2022, she and Fazal announced their impending marriage and said that the ceremony would be eco-friendly. On 4 October 2022, she married Fazal at a ceremony in Lucknow.

Off-screen work

Modeling and endorsements 
In 2014, she posed as a mermaid for a People for the Ethical Treatment of Animals ad campaign, encouraging people to avoid eating fish and to go vegetarian. The same year, she walked the ramps of Lakme Fashion Week and performed in a play called Trivial Disasters.

Political activism 
In January 2020, the actress had expressed solidarity with the students victimized in the JNU attack joining other actors from the film fraternity like Taapsee Pannu participating in a protest in Mumbai. Earlier, she opposed a police crackdown on Jamia Millia Islamia and Aligarh Muslim University students that took place on 15 December 2019 when students in these two campuses were protesting the India's Citizenship Amendment Act. Chadha created The Kindry, a social media effort, in June 2021, with the goal of amplifying ordinary good tales from society in the midst of the epidemic. The actor and her friend and entrepreneur Krishan Jagota have launched a dedicated Instagram page where they will spotlight people and their acts of goodwill.

Public views 
Chadha argues that religion in India has deteriorated into hypocrisy, whether in the treatment of women or in the celebration of festivals. Chadha insists she is not "religious," but she has a deep connection with spirituality, and the more she studies it, the more baffled she is by society's treatment of women. Chadha filed a 'public interest' notice in May 2018 with an appeal to defend Hinduism from Hindutva sympathisers. She stated that Hinduism was under attack from Hindutva leaders. Chadha stated on Twitter, "Yes, Hinduism is in peril in India." However, Hindutva proponents pose a threat to Hinduism. Get rid of Hindutva sympathisers and the religion will be saved. In the public interest." After this, Chadha received rape & murder threats from rightwing Hindu trolls. Regarding her interreligious relationship with Ali Fazal, Chadha says that there are no objections from either side because his parents understand love. She believes that once you discover love, you should retain it without worrying about anything else, and she found her love in Ali. Chadha stated that her father is a Punjabi and her mother is a Bihari, and they share a great relationship that is unaffected by any form of bigotry. She was quoted saying, “Look, this is India. We are all very mixed. My mother is Bihari whereas my dad is Punjabi and here I am sitting in front of you.

In November 2022, Chadha apologised and deleted a controversial tweet made in response to Lieutenant General Upendra Dwivedi's statement that the Indian Army is ready to take back Pakistan-Occupied Kashmir if the Indian government issues the order.

Filmography

Films

Podcast

Web series

Accolades 

 Richa Chadha was honoured with "Bharat Ratna Dr. Ambedkar Award 2020" for her significant contribution to Indian cinema. She received the honour at Raj Bhavan from the Governor of Maharashtra, Bhagat Singh Koshyari.

References

External links 

 
 
 

1986 births
Living people
Punjabi Hindus
21st-century Indian actresses
Actresses in Hindi cinema
Indian film actresses
People from Delhi
Punjabi people
St. Stephen's College, Delhi alumni
Actresses from Amritsar
Filmfare Awards winners
Screen Awards winners